The 1980 New Zealand rugby league tour of Great Britain and France was a tour by the New Zealand national rugby league team. The test series between the New Zealand national rugby league team and Great Britain was drawn one all, as was the test series between New Zealand and France.

The Kiwis were 6-1 outsiders ahead of the tour. Great Britain had won seven of the last nine encounters and the New Zealand side was almost entirely domestic based, with captain Mark Graham, Danny Campbell and Nolan Tupaea the only overseas professionals. Following the tour Fred Ah Kuoi (North Sydney Bears), James Leuluai, Dane O'Hara and Gary Kemble (Hull F.C.) and Mark Broadhurst (Manly-Warringah) subsequently secured professional contracts.

The Test series was broadcast across the United Kingdom via the BBC with chief commentator Eddie Waring and his co-commentator, former Great Britain halfback and then Salford coach Alex Murphy. The series was broadcast in New Zealand via Television New Zealand with former Kiwi fullback Des White providing the commentary.

Squad 
New Zealand were coached by Ces Mountford and captained by Mark Graham.

|- style="background:#ccf;"
| Player
| Club
| Position(s)
| Tests
| Matches
| Tries
| Goals
| F/Goals
| Points
|- style="background:#fff;"
| Fred Ah Kuoi
|  Richmond Rovers
| 
| 5
| 9
| 1
| 0
| 0
| 3
|- style="background:#fff;"
| Ray Baxendale
|  Runanga
| 
| 3
| 8
| 1
| 0
| 0
| 3
|- style="background:#fff;"
| Mark Broadhurst
|  Marist-Western Suburbs
| 
| 5
| 9
| 0
| 0
| 0
| 0
|- style="background:#fff;"
| Danny Campbell
|  Wigan
| 
| 0
| 1
| 0
| 0
| 0
| 0
|- style="background:#fff;"
| Tony Coll
|  Marist
| 
| 3
| 6
| 4
| 0
| 0
| 12
|- style="background:#fff;"
| Bruce Dickison
|  Sydenham
| 
| 4
| 8
| 2
| 0
| 0
| 6
|- style="background:#fff;"
| Barry Edkins
| NA
| 
| 1
| 7
| 0
| 9
| 0
| 18
|- style="background:#fff;"
| Kevin Fisher
|  Huntly South
| 
| 1
| 7
| 0
| 0
| 0
| 0
|- style="background:#fff;"
| Bruce Gall
| NA
| 
| 0
| 8
| 3
| 0
| 0
| 9
|- style="background:#fff;"
| Mark Graham (c)
|  Brisbane Norths
| 
| 5
| 6
| 4
| 0
| 0
| 12
|- style="background:#fff;"
| Bernie Green
|  Runanga
| 
| 0
| 5
| 2
| 0
| 0
| 6
|- style="background:#fff;"
| Bill Kells
| Ngaruwahia
| 
| 0
| 4
| 0
| 0
| 0
| 0
|- style="background:#fff;"
| Gary Kemble
|  Ellerslie Eagles
| 
| 1
| 7
| 2
| 9
| 0
| 24
|- style="background:#fff;"
| James Leuluai
|  Mt Wellington
| 
| 3
| 9
| 3
| 0
| 0
| 9
|- style="background:#fff;"
| Rick Muru
|  Taniwharau
| 
| 0
| 5
| 1
| 0
| 0
| 3
|- style="background:#fff;"
| Michael O'Donnell
|  Marist-Western Suburbs
| 
| 5
| 8
| 1
| 5
| 0
| 13
|- style="background:#fff;"
| Dane O'Hara
|  Bay Roskill
| 
| 5
| 10
| 6
| 0
| 0
| 18
|- style="background:#fff;"
| Gary Prohm
|  Otahuhu Leopards
| 
| 4
| 9
| 0
| 0
| 0
| 0
|- style="background:#fff;"
| Alan Rushton
| Eastern Suburbs
| 
| 4
| 8
| 1
| 0
| 0
| 3
|- style="background:#fff;"
| Gordon Smith
|  Waro-rakau
| 
| 4
| 7
| 1
| 15
| 0
| 33
|- style="background:#fff;"
| Howie Tamati
|  Waitara Bears
| 
| 1
| 9
| 1
| 0
| 0
| 3
|- style="background:#fff;"
| Kevin Tamati
|  Upper Hutt Tigers
| 
| 5
| 8
| 1
| 0
| 0
| 3
|- style="background:#fff;"
| Paul Te Ariki
|  Wellington
| 
| 0
| 6
| 0
| 0
| 0
| 0
|- style="background:#fff;"
| Nolan Tupaea
|  Wigan
| 
| 0
| 6
| 3
| 0
| 0
| 9
|- style="background:#fff;"
| Shane Varley
|  Point Chevalier Pirates
| 
| 0
| 7
| 1
| 0
| 0
| 3
|- style="background:#fff;"
| Graeme West
|  Hawera
| 
| 5
| 9
| 2
| 0
| 0
| 6
|- style="background:#fff;"
| John Whittaker
|  Warrington
| 
| 4
| 9
| 2
| 0
| 0
| 6

Great Britain

Test Venues 
The three tests took place at the following venues.

Blackpool Borough: Ron Oldham, Michael Chester, Steve Tilly, John Heritage, William Oxley, James Arnold, James Green, Paul Gamble, Don Parry, John Waterworth, Peter Frodsham, Philip Holmes, John Corcoran. Res – Kevin Hanley. Coach – Geoff Lyon

New Zealand: James Leuluai, Bernie Green, John Whittaker, Bruce Dickison, Gary Kemble, Nolan Tupaea, Shane Varley, Rick Muru, Howie Tamati, Kevin Tamati, Ray Baxendale, Bruce Gall, Barry Edkins. Res – Gary Prohm

Hull F.C.: George Robinson, Graham Walters, Chris Harrison, Tim Wilby, Paul Prendiville, Ian Wilson, Clive Pickerill, Keith Tindall, Ian Crowther, Vince Farrar, Charles Birdsall, Keith Boxall, Sammy Lloyd. Res – Robert Gaitley, Charlie Stone. Coach – Arthur Bunting

New Zealand: Michael O'Donnell, Kevin Fisher, James Leuluai, Bruce Dickison, Dane O'Hara, Fred Ah Kuoi, Gordon Smith, Mark Broadhurst, Alan Rushton, Kevin Tamati, Graeme West, Tony Coll, Mark Graham (c). Res – John Whittaker, Paul Te Ariki

Cumbria: Steve Tickle, John Bulman, Peter Stoddart, Ian Ball, Chris Camilleri, Ian Rudd, Arnie Walker, Terry Bowman, Alan McCurrie, John Cunningham, Vince Fox, Les Gorley, Bill Pattinson

New Zealand: Gary Kemble, Kevin Fisher, James Leuluai, Bruce Dickison, Dane O'Hara, Fred Ah Kuoi, Shane Varley, Rick Muru, Howie Tamati, Alan Rushton, Graeme West, Tony Coll, Mark Graham (c)

St Helens: Clive Griffiths, Les Jones, Denis Litherland, Roy Haggerty, Roy Mathias, Brian Parkes, Neil Holding, Mel James, Dennis Nulty, Michael Hope, Eric Chisnall, George Nicholls, Harry Pinner. Res – John Smith, Keiron Pickavance. Coach – Kel Coslett

New Zealand: James Leuluai, Bernie Green, John Whittaker, Fred Ah Kuoi, Nolan Tupaea, Bill Kells, Gordon Smith, Mark Broadhurst, Howie Tamati, Kevin Tamati, Paul Te Ariki, Bruce Gall, Gary Prohm

Bradford Northern: John Green, David Barends, Les Gant, Derek Parker, Alan Parker, Nigel Stephenson, Alan Redfearn, Jim Fiddler, Brian Noble, Phil Sanderson, Dennis Trotter, Gary Van Bellen, Graham Idle. Res – Stephen Ferres, Gary Hale. Coach – Peter Fox

New Zealand: Michael O'Donnell, Bernie Green, John Whittaker, Bruce Dickison, Gary Kemble, Nolan Tupaea, Bill Kells, Paul Te Ariki, Howie Tamati, Ray Baxendale, Bruce Gall, Gary Prohm, Barry Edkins

First Test 

Hull Kingston Rovers: Dave Hall, Steve Hubbard, Mike Smith, Phil Hogan, Wally Youngman, Steve Hartley, Paul Harkin, Roy Holdstock, Raymond Price, David Watkinson, Phil Lowe, Len Casey, Mick Crane. Res – Ian Robinson, Graham Douglas. Coach – Roger Millward

New Zealand: Gary Kemble, Gary Prohm, John Whittaker, James Leuluai, Dane O'Hara, Nolan Tupaea, Shane Varley, Mark Broadhurst, Howie Tamati, Bruce Gall, Graeme West, Ray Baxendale, Barry Edkins. Res – Paul Te Ariki

Leeds: Willie Oulton, Alan Smith, David Smith, Neil Hague, John Atkinson, John Holmes, Kevin Dick, Neil Lean, David Ward, Steve Pitchford, Graham Eccles, John Carroll, David Heron. Res – Gary Hetherington, Roy Dickinson. Coach – Robin Dewhurst

New Zealand: Michael O'Donnell, Kevin Fisher, John Whittaker, James Leuluai, Dane O'Hara, Fred Ah Kuoi, Gordon Smith, Mark Broadhurst, Alan Rushton, Kevin Tamati, Graeme West, Tony Coll, Mark Graham (c). Res – Rick Muru

Warrington: Derek Finnegan, Richard Thackray, Ian Duane, John Bevan, Steve Hesford, Jimmy Fairhurst, Alan Gwilliam, Neil Courtney, Anthony Waller, Brian Case, Tommy Martyn, Ian Potter, Edwin Hunter. Res – Billy Benyon, Bob Eccles. Coach – Billy Benyon

New Zealand: Gary Kemble, Bernie Green, Nolan Tupaea, Bruce Dickison, Gary Prohm, Bill Kells, Shane Varley, Rick Muru, Howie Tamati, Bruce Gall, Paul Te Ariki, Ray Baxendale, Barry Edkins. Res – Dane O'Hara

Second Test 

Great Britain U/24: Mick Burke, Richard Thackray, David Stephenson, Gary Hyde, Steve Fenton, Steve Evans (c), Neil Holding, Gary Van Bellen, Paul O'Neill, Brian Case, Kevin Ward, Vince Fox, Terry Flanagan. Res – Keith Bentley, Mike O'Neill. Coach – Johnny Whiteley

New Zealand: Michael O'Donnell, Gary Kemble, Gary Prohm, Dane O'Hara, Kevin Fisher, Fred Ah Kuoi, Shane Varley, Mark Broadhurst, Howie Tamati, Bruce Gall, Graeme West, Ray Baxendale, Barry Edkins. Res – Dane O'Hara

Widnes: Mick Burke, Stuart Wright, Mick George, Eddie Cunningham, Keith Bentley, Eric Hughes, Tony Myler, Brian Hogan, Keith Elwell, Glyn Shaw, Mike O'Neill, Eric Prescott, Mick Adams. Res – Wayne Rutene, Fred Whitfield. Coach – Doug Laughton

New Zealand: Michael O'Donnell, Kevin Fisher, John Whittaker, James Leuluai, Dane O'Hara, Fred Ah Kuoi, Gordon Smith, Mark Broadhurst, Alan Rushton, Kevin Tamati, Graeme West, Ray Baxendale, Tony Coll. Res – Shane Varley, Bruce Gall

Leigh: Peter Alstead, David Bullough, David Dunn, Steve Donlan, Philip Fox, Alan Fairhurst, Ken Green, Anthony Cooke, Les Wall, Terry Bowman, Ian Hobson, Alan Rathbone, Tom Gittins. Res – Alan Keaveney, Ray Tabern. Coach – Alex Murphy

New Zealand: Gary Kemble, Bernie Green, Bruce Dickison, Nolan Tupaea, Gary Prohm, Bill Kells, Shane Varley, Rick Muru, Howie Tamati, Danny Campbell, Paul Te Ariki, Bruce Gall, Barry Edkins. Res – Kevin Fisher, Alan Rushton

Third Test

France

First Test

Second Test

Statistics 
Leading try scorer
 6 by Dane O'Hara

Leading point scorer
 33 by Gordon Smith (1 try, 15 goals)

Largest Test attendance
 10,946 – Second test vs Great Britain at Odsal Stadium

Largest club game attendance
 15,945 – Hull F.C. vs New Zealand at Boothferry Park

References 

New Zealand national rugby league team tours
Rugby league tour of Great Britain
New Zealand rugby league tour of Great Britain
Rugby league tours of Great Britain
Rugby league tours of France
1980 in English rugby league
1980 in French rugby league